Don Winslow is an American author.

Don Winslow may also refer to a fictional character who is the hero of
Don Winslow of the Coast Guard, a film serial
Don Winslow of the Navy, a film serial
Don Winslow of the Navy (comic strip)
Don Winslow of the Navy (radio program)